Li Qingwei (1920 – October 18, 1994) was a People's Republic of China politician. He was born in Xingtai, Hebei Province. He joined the Communist Party of China in 1937. He was governor of Shaanxi Province.

1920 births
1994 deaths
People's Republic of China politicians from Hebei
Chinese Communist Party politicians from Hebei
Governors of Shaanxi
People from Xingtai
CCP committee secretaries of Henan